Raymond A. Finney, Jr. (born March 29, 1941) is a former Republican member of the Tennessee Senate representing the 8th district, which encompasses Blount and Sevier counties.
 
In the 104th General Assembly, he was Assistant Floor Leader for the Senate Republican Caucus, as well as Vice-Chair of Senate Government Operations, and he served on the Senate Environment, Conservation and Tourism Committee and the Senate General Welfare, Health and Human Resources Committee.  In the 105th General Assembly, he served as the Chair of the Calendar Committee, the Chair of Select Oversight Committee on TennCare, Secretary of the General Welfare, Health and Human Resources Committee and was a member of the Environment, Conservation and Tourism Committee and the Finance, Ways and Means Committee.

Finney graduated from the University of Tennessee in Knoxville with a B.S., and in 1964 he received an M.D. from the University of Tennessee College of Medicine in Memphis. For one year he worked as a surgical intern in Memphis hospitals, and for four years he worked as an anatomic and clinical pathology resident at The University of Tennessee Medical Center in Knoxville.

Finney has previously worked at the United States Public Health Service.  He retired in 1999 from practice as a pathologist and laboratory director at Blount Memorial Hospital in Maryville, Tennessee.

Creationism in public schools 
In February 2007, Finney filed a state senate resolution which asked the Tennessee Department of Education to address a number of creationist points.  In his resolution, Finney requested that the Department of Education answer three particular questions regarding creationism and the teaching of creationism in public schools. The first question asks:

Question two assumes that the answer to the first question is Yes, and then goes on to query:

If the answer to the first question is This question cannot be proved or disproved, the resolution then goes on to ask:

Finally, if in the opinion of the Department of Education, the answer to the first question is No, the resolution offers

References

External links
Raymond Finney's profile at the Tennessee General Assembly website

See also
Matthew Hill
Tennessee Lt. Governor Ron Ramsey

Tennessee state senators
Living people
1941 births